Dr. Mohammed Lutf Al-Eryani is a Yemeni scientist, diplomat and politician. He quit his position as Ambassador to Germany over the 2011 Yemeni uprising. Considered an expert in water management, he has also served as Water and Environment Minister of Yemen.

References

http://almasdaronline.com/article/17748

Yemeni scientists
Yemeni politicians
Yemeni diplomats
Ambassadors of Yemen to Germany
Living people
Year of birth missing (living people)
People from Ibb Governorate
Water and Environment ministers of Yemen